is a town in Aichi Prefecture, Japan. The town merged into Nagoya on 1 December 1964, and became a part of Midori-ku, Nagoya.

The town is known for being the location of the Battle of Okehazama in 1560, where Oda Nobunaga defeated Imagawa Yoshimoto and established himself as one of the front-running warlords in the Sengoku period.

History
The area used to be inhabited before 1608. In 1608, the Owari Domain which was developing the Tōkaidō asked residents of Chita Peninsula to move to the area, creating the village. When the village was first created, it was technically a part of Okehazama village, but it became independent in 1625. The entire village was burned by fire in 1784.

In 1892, Arimatsu was elevated to town status, and also merged with Okehazama village which was annexed by Kyowa Village in 1893.

References

External links
 Tie-dyeing Museum
 prints of the  Road - Station 42, 

Dissolved municipalities of Aichi Prefecture